Secret Friends is a 1991 British film written and directed by Dennis Potter and starring Alan Bates, Gina Bellman and Ian McNeice. It was based on Potter's novel Ticket to Ride. The screenplay concerns a man whose fantasy spirals out of control.

Premise
During a train journey, a man's fantasy spirals out of control.

Cast
 Alan Bates - John
 Gina Bellman - Helen
 Frances Barber - Angela
 Tony Doyle - Martin
 Joanna David - Kate
 Ian McNeice - First Businessman
 Davyd Harries - Second Businessman
 Colin Jeavons - Vicar
 Rowena Cooper - Vicar's Wife

References

External links

1991 films
1991 comedy-drama films
British comedy-drama films
Films directed by Dennis Potter
Films with screenplays by Dennis Potter
1990s English-language films
1990s British films